Kory Kalani Kahaunaele Sperry (born April 10, 1985) is a former American football tight end. He played college football at Colorado State.

Early years
He attended high school at Pueblo County High School in Pueblo, Colorado.

Professional career

Miami Dolphins
In Week 10 of the 2009 NFL season, Sperry was activated by the Dolphins. He caught the first touchdown pass of his career against the Tampa Bay Buccaneers.

Sperry was waived by Miami on August 23, 2010.

Denver Broncos
Sperry was claimed off waivers by the Denver Broncos on August 24.

Sperry was waived by Denver Broncos on September 3, 2010.

San Diego Chargers
Sperry was signed by the San Diego Chargers on September 7, 2010.
Sperry was waived by the chargers on August 31, 2012.

Arizona Cardinals
Sperry was signed by the Arizona Cardinals on December 4, 2012.

Minnesota Vikings
Sperry was signed by the Minnesota Vikings on August 10, 2014. The Vikings released Sperry on August 25, 2014.

References

External links
Arizona Cardinals bio
Colorado State Rams bio

1985 births
Living people
Sportspeople from Pueblo, Colorado
Players of American football from Colorado
American football tight ends
Colorado State Rams football players
San Diego Chargers players
Miami Dolphins players
Denver Broncos players
Arizona Cardinals players